Ricardo López-Nuño Díez (2 March 1940 – 11 February 2015), better known as Ricardo Palacios, was a Spanish actor, film director and screenwriter.

Born in Reinosa (Cantabria), Palacios graduated from the Official Film School in Madrid as an actor and director. He debuted in the 1961 TV series Poly.

He participated in about 150 films and television series, being mainly active in the Spaghetti Western genre, and he was also a recurring presence in films directed by Jesús Franco.

In 1987, Palacios made his directorial debut with the  comedy film ¡Biba la banda! starring Alfredo Landa, and in 1997 he directed the TV-series La banda de Pérez.

After spending over a month in hospital with heart problems, Ricardo died on 11 February 2015 of heart failure.

Filmography

References

Further reading 
 Aguilar, Carlos. Ricardo Palacios: Actor, director, observador. Tantin Ediciones, 2003. .

External links

1940 births
2015 deaths
Spanish film directors
Spanish male film actors
People from Reinosa
Spanish screenwriters
Spanish male writers
Male screenwriters
Spanish male television actors
Male Spaghetti Western actors